Hawthorn Quarry  is a Site of Special Scientific Interest in the Easington district of east County Durham, England. It is a working quarry, currently operated by Tarmac, which is situated just north of the eastern end of Hawthorn Dene SSSI.

The site has been identified by the Geological Conservation Review as being of significant national importance for its exposures of high quality Middle Magnesian Limestone, which include reef beds, overlying boulder beds, stromatolites and bedded oolites. The site is considered highly valuable for an understanding of the later evolution of carbonate environments of the Middle Magnesian.

Hawthorn Quarry is located within the defined Hawthorn Beacon/Hill Mineral Consultation Area (MCA),which was first designated in 1981 and is now protected through saved County Durham Minerals Local Plan Policy (MLP) M14. Policy M14 states that development will only be permitted within or adjoining a Mineral Consultation Area including where it would not sterilise significant quantities of potential mineral resources. Paragraph 204 of the NPPF recognises that "planning policies should safeguard mineral resources by defining Mineral Safeguarding Areas; and adopt appropriate policies so that known locations of specific minerals resources of local and national importance and are not sterilised by non-mineral development" 

Despite the strategic national significance of the site, Durham County Council issued outline planning permission in November 2018 to construct 1500 new houses on land adjacent to Hawthorn Quarry, which could effectively sterilise local minerals production and further expansion.

During the November 2018 council meetings, Durham County Council was advised by its own planning experts : "it is considered that the proposed development would sterilise significant quantities of mineral resources including potentially high grade (Ford Formation) magnesian limestone, which is highly likely to extend outside of the permitted quarry boundary for an unknown distance. This is judged to be significant because it is understood that the Ford Formation magnesian limestone in and around Hawthorn Quarry can be considered to be of a very high grade, with low levels of impurities, and is one of a handful of known high purity magnesian limestone resource areas within the United Kingdom…. When all of the available information is considered in the round, and considering all of the above, it is concluded by officers that the proposed development would result in the significant sterilisation of a high grade minerals resource, and would therefore be in conflict with MLP Policy M14”

References

Sites of Special Scientific Interest in County Durham
Quarries in County Durham